Shota Yuriyevich Khinchagashvili (born 9 January 1951 in Dusheti) is a retired Georgian football player.

Honours
 Soviet Top League winner: 1978.
 Soviet Cup winner: 1976, 1979.
 UEFA Cup Winners' Cup winner: 1981.

International career
Khinchagashvili made his debut for USSR on 28 November 1976 in a friendly against Argentina. He played in 1978 FIFA World Cup and UEFA Euro 1980 qualifiers (USSR did not qualify for the final tournament for either).

External links
  Profile

1951 births
Living people
Footballers from Georgia (country)
Soviet footballers
Soviet Union international footballers
Soviet Top League players
FC Metalurgi Rustavi players
FC Dinamo Tbilisi players
Association football defenders
People from Dusheti
Honoured Masters of Sport of the USSR